This page is a timeline of online advertising. Major launches, milestones and other major events are included.

Overview

Timeline 

(*) Such launches are not initial launches, but rather re-launches.

See also 
 Timeline of e-commerce
 Online advertising

References 

Online Advertising